Anna Lindgren (10 May 1946 – 16 April 2015) was  a Swedish Moderate Party politician and  former  member of the Riksdag.

Lindgren was a teacher and local politician in Linköping before being elected in 2002. She declined to stand again in 2006. She is married to Sven Lindgren, the Governor of Kalmar County.

References

External links
Anna Lindgren at the Riksdag website

1946 births
2015 deaths
Members of the Riksdag from the Moderate Party
Women members of the Riksdag
Members of the Riksdag 2002–2006
21st-century Swedish women politicians